The term Unfederated Malay States was the collective name given to five British protected states in the Malay peninsula in the first half of the twentieth century. These states were Johor, Kedah, Kelantan, Perlis, and Terengganu. In contrast with the four adjoining Federated Malay States of Selangor, Perak, Pahang, and Negeri Sembilan, the five Unfederated Malay States lacked common institutions, and did not form a single state in international law; they were in fact standalone British protectorates.

In 1946 the British colony of the Straits Settlements was dissolved. Penang and Malacca which had formed a part of the Straits Settlements were then grouped with the Unfederated Malay States and the Federated Malay States to form the Malayan Union. In 1948, the Malayan Union was reconstituted as a federation of eleven states known as the Federation of Malaya. Nine of the states of the new Federation of Malaya continued as British Protected States, while two of them, Penang and Malacca, remained as British colonies. The Federation of Malaya gained full independence from the UK in August 1957.

History
Johor accepted a treaty of protection with the United Kingdom in 1885, and eventually succumbed to British pressure to accept a resident "Advisor" in 1914.  Unlike the other Malay states under British protection, however, Johor remained outside of the Federated Malay States (formed in 1895).

Under the Bangkok Treaty of 1909, Siam transferred its rights over some of the northern Malay states (Kelantan, Terengganu, Kedah, and Perlis) to the United Kingdom. These states then became British Protected States. With the assistance of Japan, they temporarily returned to Thai jurisdiction for the latter part of the Second World War.

Administration and language
The chief officer of the British colonial administration was the "Advisor".  In contrast with the Federated Malay States, the Unfederated Malay States enjoyed greater autonomy.  The de facto official language of the Unfederated Malay States was Malay (written with the Jawi script).

References

 
Former countries in Malaysian history
British Malaya
History of Johor
History of Terengganu
History of Kelantan
History of Kedah
History of Perlis
Malay States, Unfederated
 
Former countries of the interwar period